Even Better Than the Real Thing Vol. 2 is an Irish charity album featuring a variety of artists performing acoustic cover versions of popular songs. It was released in 2004 by RMG Chart Entertainment Ltd. Just like volume 1, most of the songs on the album were recorded live and acoustic on The Ray D'Arcy Show on Today FM.

The album was made in aid of the National Children's Hospital in Tallaght & Barretstown.

Track listing

See also
 Even Better Than the Real Thing Vol. 1
 Even Better Than the Real Thing Vol. 3

References

2004 compilation albums
Compilation albums by Irish artists
Charity albums
The Ray D'Arcy Show